Sir Francis Raymond Connelly (1 September 1895 – 4 May 1949) was an Australian businessman and politician, who served as Lord Mayor of Melbourne from 1945-1948.

Footnotes

1895 births
1949 deaths
Mayors and Lord Mayors of Melbourne
Australian politicians awarded knighthoods
20th-century Australian politicians
20th-century Australian businesspeople